Super Bowl Sunday is a 1985 video game published by The Avalon Hill Game Company.

Gameplay
Super Bowl Sunday is a game in which American football is simulated in a strategy game based on statistics.

Reception
Wyatt Lee reviewed the game for Computer Gaming World, and wrote that "the game is worth playing and offers realistic results."

Reviews
Computer Gamer - Feb, 1987
ASM (Aktueller Software Markt) - Feb, 1987
Tilt - Jun, 1987

References

External links
Review in Family Computing
Review in Compute!'s Gazette
Review in Computer Play
Review in Ahoy!
Review in GAMES Magazine
Review in Compute!'s Gazette

1985 video games
American football video games
Apple II games
Avalon Hill video games
Commodore 64 games
Turn-based strategy video games
Video games developed in the United States
Video games set in the United States